Voices is the fourth studio album by Murray Head. It was released in 1981. Many musicians from Fairport Convention are featured here, Richard Thompson, Simon Nicol, Dave Pegg and Dave Mattacks. Cat Stevens' guitarist Alun Davies is also playing on the album, as well as Bob Weston and Jeff Beck.

Track listing
All tracks composed by Murray Head
"Last Daze of an Empire" - 4:17
"Affair Across a Crowded Room" - 4:37
"Hey Lady" - 3:05
"On your Own Again" - 3:45
"She's Doing Time on the Line" - 4:00
"Chance Encounter" - 3:37
"Children Only Play (Do You Remember?)" - 4:46
"Old Soho" - 4:05
"A Tree" - 4:01
"Going Home" - 3:38
"Los Angeles" - 4:50
"How Many Ways" - 4:24
"Never Even Thought" - 5:31

Personnel
Murray Head - vocals, acoustic guitar
Jeff Beck - guitar
Richard Thompson - guitar
Simon Nicol - guitar
Geoffrey Richardson - acoustic guitar
Bob Weston - acoustic guitar
Alun Davies - acoustic guitar, background vocals, vibraphone
Paul Whittaker - guitar
Gary Taylor - acoustic guitar, bass guitar
Dave Pegg - bass guitar, mandolin
Pat Donaldson - bass guitar
Simon Jeffes - bass guitar
Bruce Lynch - double bass
Rupert Hine - harmonica, piano
Peter Veitch - organ, Roland synthesizer, violin, accordion, Fender Rhodes, barrel organ
Jeff Allen - drums
Stephanie Spring - drums
Steve Fletcher - drums, percussion, keyboards, background vocals
Dave Mattacks - drums, percussion
Trevor Morais - drums
Andy Newmark - drums
Morris Pert - percussion
Dyan Birch - vocals
Anthony Stewart Head - choir, chorus
Paul Samwell-Smith - vibraphone
Christopher Warren-Green - violin, cello  
Nigel Warren-Green - violin, cello
Norman Zulu - choir, chorus
Clifton Davis - choir, chorus
Sue Lynch - voices
Chris Mercer - saxophone
Nicola Kerr - girls voice on "Children Only Play (Do You Remember?)"
Technical
Mike Bobak, Robert Ash - engineer
Michael Ross - design, photography

References

External links
Voices at the official Murray Head site.

Murray Head albums
1981 albums
Albums produced by Paul Samwell-Smith
Albums recorded at Morgan Sound Studios